The Kuma Kogen Astronomical Observatory (Obs. code: 360) is located at Kumakōgen in Ehime Prefecture, Japan. 

The observatory is in the Furusato Country Open Air Museum that incorporates the Seiten Castle (sei ten means "fine weather" and can also mean "star sky".)

Telescope
The observatory has a 60 cm aperture optical telescope. 

Members of the public can book to observe at night, weather permitting.

Planetarium
A 40-seat planetarium is attached to the facility. Thirty-minute shows are conducted during the day.

Staff
The observatory's best known staff member is the prolific discoverer of asteroids, Akimasa Nakamura.

References

External links
 Kuma Kogen Observatory home page – English version

Astronomical observatories in Japan
Planetaria in Japan